Elsa Emilia Rantalainen (1901–1988) was a Finnish actress. She was most active as an actress between 1933 and 1951. From 1931 until 1941 she was married to Wäinö Aaltonen. In 1954, she was awarded the Pro Finlandia award. She was a member of and performer at the Raittiusyhdistys Koitto.

Works

1943, Katariina ja Munkkiniemen kreivi
1943, Tuomari Martta

References

External links

1901 births
1988 deaths
Actresses from Tampere
People from Häme Province (Grand Duchy of Finland)
20th-century Finnish actresses
Recipients of the Order of the Lion of Finland